The Business Motivation Model (BMM) in enterprise architecture provides a scheme and structure for developing, communicating, and managing business plans in an organized manner. Specifically, the Business Motivation Model does all the following:
 identifies factors that motivate the establishing of business plans;
 identifies and defines the elements of business plans; and 
 indicates how all these factors and elements inter-relate.

History 
Initially developed by the Business Rules Group (BRG), in September 2005, the Object Management Group (OMG) voted to accept the Business Motivation Model as the subject of a Request for Comment (RFC).  This meant that the OMG was willing to consider the Business Motivation Model as a specification to be adopted by the OMG, subject to comment from any interested parties.  Adoption as an OMG specification carries the intention that the Business Motivation Model would, in time, be submitted to the International Organization for Standardization (ISO) as a standard.

In August 2008 version 1.0 was released by OMG.

In May 2015, version 1.3 of BMM specification  was released and as of May 2015 it is the latest stable release.

Elements 
“BMM captures business requirements across different dimensions to rigorously capture and justify why the business wants to do something, what it is aiming to achieve, how it plans to get there, and how it assesses the result.”

The main elements of BMM are:
 Ends: What (as opposed to how) the business wants to accomplish
 Means: How the business intends to accomplish its ends
 Directives: The rules and policies that constrain or govern the available means
 Influencers: Can cause changes that affect the organization in its employment of its means or achievement of its ends. Influencers are neutral by definition.
 Assessment: A judgment of an Influencer that influences the organization's ability to achieve its ends or use its means.

Referenced

standards 
 Semantics of Business Vocabulary and Business Rules (SBVR)

Other related frameworks are: 
 POLDAT 
 Zachman Framework
Business framework

See also 
 Business model
 i*
 Motivation
 Strategy Markup Language

References

Further reading

External links 

 The Business Motivation Model Business Governance in a Volatile World, Release 1.3, Business Rules Group (2007) 
 From the Business Motivation Model to Service Oriented Architecture, by Birol Berkem, Journal of Object Technology vol.7, no.8– (2008)
 The Business Motivation Model Business Governance in a Volatile World, Release 1.3, September 2007

Business process
Enterprise modelling